Thomas Reid (1710–1796) was a Scottish philosopher.

Thomas or Tom Reid may also refer to:

Sir Thomas Reid, 1st Baronet (1762–1824), Scottish businessman, director and governor of East India Co.
Thomas Mayne Reid (aviator) (1895–?), Canadian aviation pioneer, see Trans-Canada Trophy
Thomas Mayne Reid (1818–1883), Irish-American novelist
Tommy Reid (footballer) (1905–1972), Scottish footballer
Tommy Reid (pastor), American evangelist
Thomas Reid (British politician) (1881–1963), Member of Parliament for Swindon, 1945–1955
Thomas Reid (naval surgeon) (1791–1825), Irish born Royal naval surgeon and prison reformer
Thomas Reid , founder of Falmouth, Jamaica
Thomas Wemyss Reid (1842–1905), British newspaper editor, novelist and biographer
Tom Reid (rugby league), New Zealand international
Tom Reid (ice hockey) (born 1946), American ice hockey player
Tom Reid (footballer, born 1901) (1901–?), English soccer player
Thomas Reid (Canadian politician) (1886–1968), Canadian businessman and politician in the province of British Columbia
Thomas Reid (humanist) (died 1624), Scottish humanist and philosopher
Thomas M. Reid (born 1966), American author and game designer
T. R. Reid (Thomas Roy Reid) (born 1943), American reporter, documentary film correspondent, and author
Tom Reid (rugby union) (1926–1996), Irish rugby union player
Tom Reid (electrical engineer) (1927–2010), involved in Apollo program
Thomas Reid (clockmaker) (1746–1831), Edinburgh clockmaker
Thomas R. Reid (1839-1917), American politician
Thomas Reid (born 1962), Irish farmer, subject of the documentary film The Lonely Battle of Thomas Reid

See also
Thomas Reed (disambiguation)
Thomas Read (disambiguation)